Thorailles is a commune in the Loiret department in north-central France. It is around 12 km east of Montargis and 100 km south of the centre of Paris.

See also
Communes of the Loiret department

References

Communes of Loiret